Baladeh is a city and capital of Baladeh District of Nur County, Mazandaran Province, Iran. Baladeh is situated on the Noor River. At the 2006 census, its population was 1,134, in 339 families.

Baladeh castle 
 Baladeh castle is one of the important fortress among the other castles in Mazandaran province. The castle was established even in the early Safavid era. It has made on the top of top of mount and can be seen from the city. After the defeat of the Paduspani dynasty, the Safavids seized the castle. It was in use as recently as the 18th century although its origins go back at least to 700 C.E.

See also

Nima Yooshij

References

External links
 "Baladeh, Iran", Falling Rain Genomics, Inc.

Populated places in Nur County
Cities in Mazandaran Province